Justice Skinner may refer to:

Richard Skinner (American politician) (1778–1833), chief justice of the Vermont Supreme Court
Onias C. Skinner (1817–1877), associate justice of the Illinois Supreme Court
Alonzo A. Skinner (1814–1877), associate justice of the Oregon Supreme Court

See also
Judge Skinner (disambiguation)